Edo Shigenaga (江戸重長) was a Japanese samurai lord and gokenin in the late Heian and early Kamakura period, who was the second head of the Edo clan. He first settled and lent his name to the fishing village Edo that eventually grew to become Tokyo. He was also known as Edo Taro.

In 1180, Shigenaga was asked by Minamoto no Yoritomo to cooperate in his uprising against the rule of the Taira clan in Kyoto. Hesitant at first, Shigenaga eventually helped Yoritomo overthrow the Taira rule. Yoritomo granted Shigenaga seven new estates in Musashi Province, including Kitami in what is now Tokyo's western Setagaya Ward.

References

Edo
Year of birth unknown
Year of death unknown